Labanda chloromela is a species of moth in the family Nolidae first described by Francis Walker in 1858. It is found in Sri Lanka.

References

Moths of Asia
Moths described in 1858
Chloephorinae